5-Epiaristolochene synthase (EC 4.2.3.61, 5-epi-aristolochene synthase, tobacco epiaristolochene synthase, farnesyl pyrophosphate cyclase, EAS, TEAS) is an enzyme with systematic name (2E,6E)-farnesyl-diphosphate diphosphate-lyase ((+)-5-epiaristolochene-forming). This enzyme catalyses the following chemical reaction

 (2E,6E)-farnesyl diphosphate  (+)-5-epiaristolochene + diphosphate

Initial cyclization gives (+)-germacrene A in an enzyme-bound form.

References

External links 

EC 4.2.3